Kecskemét is a city with county rights central part Hungary. It is the eighth-largest city in the country, and the county seat of Bács-Kiskun.

Kecskemét lies halfway between the capital Budapest and the country's third-largest city, Szeged,  from both of them and almost equal distance from the two big rivers of the country, the Danube and the Tisza. It is the northern of two centres of the Hungarian Southern Great Plain (Hungarian: Dél-Alföld) region (comprising the three counties Bács-Kiskun, Békés and Csongrád); the southern centre is Szeged, the seat of Csongrád county.

Etymology
The name of the city stems from the Hungarian word kecske meaning "goat" and -mét meaning "pass".

Geography 
The territory west of the city is covered by wind-blown sand, characterised by the almost parallel northern-southern sand dunes and the plain between them. At the end of the 18th and the beginning of the 19th centuries, the pastures had become depleted. Overgrazing by cattle had destroyed the natural vegetation cover, and the movement of sand seriously endangered the town. Concentrated reforestation and planting of fruit and vines was carried out to stabilise the soil again.

Kecskemét is in the centre of Kiskunság, one of Hungary's famous regions. The Kiskunság National Park was established in 1975 to preserve the many different regional species of plants and animals. It is a "mosaic"-type national park, consisting of units that are not connected.

Climate 
The characteristic weather in the Kecskemét region of Kiskunság is continental warm, dry, sometimes extreme. The amount of sunlight makes it possible for the region to produce agricultural products such as wheat, apricots, red peppers, and tomatoes.

Early spring and late autumn frosts are frequent on the Great Hungarian Plain. The possibility of frost usually ends only in the middle of April. After the third week of October, the temperature is frequently below .

History 

The first archaeological trace of a human in the area is about five thousand years old. The Sarmatians invaded the area in the first century B.C.; since then the area has been continuously inhabited by a variety of cultures. János Hornyik, the first town historian, believed that the settlement known as Partiskum of the Sarmatian Jazygian was here. Contemporary consensus among historians is that it is more likely permanent settlement occurred only after the Hungarian conquest. At the beginning of the 13th century, there were seven villages in the area, each with a population of 200–300 formed near the village church, a typical rural pattern. They were all destroyed by the Mongol Invasion. Some of the villages revived at the time of the Cumanians' colonization.

As Kecskemét was situated at an important trading route, it grew as a customhouse and a market-place; in 1368 it was identified in one of King Louis I of Hungary's charters as an oppidium (town). The town's active economic life and relatively dense population attracted more traders, craftsmen and residents, including Jews who became an important part of the town.

During the Turkish invasion, settlers from neighboring villages sought shelter in Kecskemét, which was protected by defensive palisades. They also were escaping the oppression of the spahi landlords. In addition to the protection of its setting, the town of Kecskemét had arranged to pay tax directly to the pasha in Buda, thus gaining his protection and enjoying a special situation.

Kecskemét gradually absorbed the lands of those who had taken refuge in the town. Residents created a large common field for the animals they were breeding. By the beginning of the 18th century, residents held nearly 30,000 cattle, which grazed on an almost  field.

At the end of the 18th century, animal breeding started to decline in economic importance, as the fields had become overgrazed and denuded. It took nearly 100 years before the region developed its next major agricultural commodity. In the 19th century, Kecskemét was already part of an important wine district, but the city increased in importance after the vine-pest destroyed most vineyards in the hilly regions. Damage was less significant in the plains' areas of loose, sandy soil. In the 1870s, landowners planted large plantations of grapevines around the town. These were the basis of the 20th-century vineyards and wine industry of the 20th century in Kecskemét. Cottage-type settlements grew up at the vineyards to house workers, a pattern still characteristic of the rural areas around the town. The growth of the wine industry stimulated those of the food industry and trade. The city is still known for its barackpálinka, an apricot brandy.

With their accumulation of capital, peasants began to adopt bourgeois customs and goods, stimulating trade in the town. Such regional wealth led to construction of new buildings, especially those surrounding Kecskemét's main square. This Art Nouveau complex is architecturally significant: the Town Hall, the New College, the Ornamented Palace, the Luther-Palace, the House of Trade (today the House of Young), and the Gentlemen's Casino, now used as the Hungarian Museum of Photography.

The town's growth suffered in the 1929–33 economic world crisis and Great Depression, followed by the upheaval and destruction of World War II. During the war and especially May–June 1944, Hungarian authorities rounded up and deported most of the Jews from the city to Auschwitz-Birkenau, where most were killed. Jewish Hungarians had been an important part of Kecskemét's thriving culture and trade. After 1945, the new Communist government, strongly influenced by the Soviet Union, imposed a different social-political system. Kecskemét's development slowed. Due to reorganisation in local government, Kecskemét lost its big territory; several new independent villages were formed in the area. They were economically connected to the town.

In 1950, for the first time, Kecskemét took on a significant political administrative role, as it was made seat of the country's largest county, Bács-Kiskun. In the special system of the so-called controlled economy under the Communist regimes, such status provided political and financial advantages that greatly helped the city continue its growth. The architect József Kerényi (1900–1975) adapted and renovated several historic buildings for other uses, helping keep the varied historical character of the city alive. For instance, in the early 1970s, he renovated the early-eighteenth-century Franciscan monastery for use as the Zoltán Kodály Conservatory; it opened for classes in 1975.The Hungarian Association of Photographers formed the Hungarian Photography Foundation in 1990. It helped raise funds for the restoration of an 18th-century building in Kecskemét last used as an Orthodox synagogue. It was adapted for the Hungarian Museum of Photography (Magyar Fotográfiai Múzeum), which opened in 1991. The museum holds work by Hungarian and other photographers of international and national reputations. It especially collects Hungarian photographers who successfully worked abroad.

On 18 June 2008, German car manufacturer Daimler announced that it would build a Mercedes-Benz manufacturing plant in Kecskemét, planning to invest €800 million (US$1.24 billion). The plant, one of the biggest if not the biggest-ever in the region, provides work for 2,500 people.

Economy 
In March 2012, the German automobile manufacturer Daimler AG opened a plant nearby Kecskemét, to manufacture the new B-Class, A-Class and CLA-Class models. The Stuttgart-based company invested €800 million (US$1.24 billion) to build the new plant, which is expected to create 3,000 new jobs in the region. According to the plans, more than 100,000 vehicles will be produced annually at the factory.

As of 2021, the largest companies were:

Mercedes-Benz – cars: 5,000 employees
Duvenbeck IMMO – logistic: 1,100 employees
ACPS Automotive – towbars: 1,000 employees
Knorr-Bremse – brakes: 950 employees
Phoenix Mecano – enclosures and mechanical components: 850 employees
CabTec – cable: 800 employees
Fornetti – baked goods: 800 employees
Univer Product – canned goods: 800 employees

In the city, unemployment is extremely low. Over the last few years, thousands of jobs have been created to promote a low unemployment rate. In 2021, unemployment was 3.60%.

Public transport 

With the 1900s industrialisation of Hungary, Kecskemét developed public transportation by trams for a population of 50,000. Not until after World War II did bus travel begin in the city. In 2010, with competitive funding from the EU, the city launched a number of trolley bus lines and in 2011 completely rebuilt the town centre as a trolleybus and pedestrian tourist zone.

Currently, bus travel is the only public transportation to many destinations. Bus destinations:

1 Noszlopy park - GAMF - Homokbánya kollégium
1D Homokbánya kollégium - Mercedes gyár I. kapu
2 Széchenyi tér - Rendőrfalu
2A Széchenyi tér - Gokart Stadion
2D Noszlopy park - Mercedes gyár I. kapu
2S Noszlopy park - Déli Ipartelep - SMP gyár
3 Széchenyi tér - Műkertváros - Nyíri Úti Kórház
3A Széchenyi tér - Műkertváros
4 Margaréta Otthon - Széchenyi tér - Repülőtér
4A Széchenyi tér - Kisfái
4C Széchenyi tér - Repülőtér
5 Széchenyi tér - Máriaváros
6 Széchenyi tér - Szeleifalu
7 Noszlopy park - Knorr Bremse - Szilády Nyomda
7C Noszlopy park - Mindszenti körút
9 Széchenyi tér - Talfája köz
10 Széchenyi tér - TESCO M5 Hipermarket
11 Széchenyi tér - Petőfiváros - Kadafalvi út
11A Széchenyi tér - Petőfiváros - AUCHAN Kereskedelmi Központ
12 Margaréta Otthon - Belváros - Köztemető I. kapu
12D Hunyadiváros (Serleg utca) - Mercedes gyár I. kapu
13 Széchenyi tér - Knorr Bremse
13D Széchenyi tér - Mercedes-gyár I. kapu
13K Széchenyi tér - Georg Knorr út
14 Széchenyi tér - Széchenyiváros
14D Széchenyiváros (Margaréta Otthon) - Mercedes gyár I. kapu
15 Noszlopy park - Hetényegyháza
15D Hetényegyháza - Mercedes gyár I. kapu
16 Széchenyi tér - Miklovicsfalu
18 Széchenyi tér - Köztemető II. kapu
19 Noszlopy park - Miklóstelep
20 Széchenyi tér - Megyei Kórház - Széchenyiváros
20H Széchenyi tér - Köztemető II. kapu - Kórházak - Széchenyi tér
21 Noszlopy park - Széchenyiváros - Nagykörút - Noszlopy park
21D Noszlopy park - Kurucz körút - Mercedes gyár I. kapu
22 Noszlopy park - Csabay Géza körút - Nagykörút - Noszlopy park
23 Széchenyi tér - Katonatelep
23A Széchenyi tér - Hunyadiváros - Katonatelep
25 Noszlopy park - Műkertváros
28 Széchenyi tér - Szeleifalu
29 Széchenyi tér - Hetényegyháza
32 Noszlopy park - Matkó
34 Kadafalva - Széchenyiváros - Kadafalva
34A Széchenyi tér - Széchenyiváros - Kadafalva
34V Kadafalva - Petőfiváros - Kadafalva
169 Széchenyi tér - Miklovicsfalu - Széchenyi tér
350 Máriaváros vasútállomás - Széchenyiváros
353 Hetényegyháza vasútállomás - Hetényegyháza központ
354 Hetényegyháza vasútállomás - Hetényegyháza központ
916 Széchenyi tér - Talfája köz - Széchenyi tér

Demographics 
Kecskemét has 107,267 residents. The population is homogeneous with a large Hungarian majority. A few thousand of the Romani minority live in the city; they formed their independent minority government in 1994. (95% Hungarian; 0.8% Romani; 0.4% German; 0.2% Slovak; 4.8% other.) The city had a thriving Jewish population before World War II, as represented by their grand synagogue. Most of the Jews were deported by the Nazi forces in 1944 to concentration camps, where they were killed.

The Vice President of the German minority in Kecskemet is Ms Rozalia Neuendorf. Since 19 March 2007, there is also a minority self-government for Croats in Kecskemét.

Districts 

Kecskemét is divided into 21+1 sections.

Belváros (Downtown)
I. Árpádváros (Árpádtown)
II. Máriaváros (Marytown)
III. Széchenyiváros (Széchenyitown)
IV. Bethlenváros (Bethlentown)
V. Rákócziváros (Rákóczitown)
VI. Erzsébetváros (Elisabethtown)
VII. Kossuthváros (Kossuthtown)
VIII. Hunyadiváros (Hunyaditown)
IX. Szent István-város (Műkertváros, Szolnoki-hegy) (Saint Stephen town)
X. Szent László-város (Rendőrfalu) (Saint Ladislaus town)
XI. Alsószéktó (Szeleifalu)
XII. Felsőszéktó (Petőfiváros, Sutusfalu)
XIII. Talfája
XIV. Katonatelep
XV. Repülőtér (Reptéri-lakótelep)
XVI. Matkó
XVII. Kadafalva
XVIII. Szarkás
XIX. Hetényegyháza
XX. Méntelek
XXI. Borbáspuszta

Main sights 
City Hall
"Cifra Palota"
Co-Cathedral of the Ascension of the Lord, Kecskemét
Old Church
Synagogue
József Katona Theatre
Hungarian Museum of Photography
Museum of Hungarian Naive Artists
MiG-21 Monument

Activities 
Adventure Spa & Waterslide Park www.csuszdapark.hu
Kecskemét Baths http://www.kecskemetifurdo.hu/
Kecskemét Wild Park http://www.zookecskemet.hu/
Katona József Theatre of Kecskemét http://kecskemetikatona.hu/hu/english.
Kecskemét Arboretum http://www.kecskemetiarboretum.hu/

Events  
Csiperó- Future of Europe International childrend and youth meeting 
Kecskemét Animation Film Festival
Kecskemét Air Show

Politics 
The current mayor of Kecskemét is Klaudia Szemereyné Pataki (Fidesz-KDNP).

The local Municipal Assembly, elected at the 2019 local government elections, is made up of 21 members (1 Mayor, 14 Individual constituencies MEPs and 6 Compensation List MEPs) divided into this political parties and alliances:

List of mayors
List of City Mayors from 1990:

Notable natives and residents
András Gáspár (1804–1884), Hungarian General
Adrienne Nagy (born 1988) Hungarian pop singer
József Katona (1791–1830), author
Antal Szabó (1875-1926), painter
Zoltán Kodály (1882–1967), Hungarian composer, ethnomusicologist, educator, linguist and philosopher. A music conservatory was named in his honor. The train station was built on the site of his family's house.
Kálmán Latabár (1902–1970), actor, comedian
Nicolas Abraham (1919–1975), French psychoanalyst
Ákos Kónya (born 1974), ultramarathoner

Twin towns – sister cities

Kecskemét is twinned with:

 Aomori, Japan
 Berehove, Ukraine
 Coventry, England, United Kingdom
 Dornbirn, Austria
 Galanta, Slovakia
 Hyvinkää, Finland
 Lidköping, Sweden
 Nahariya, Israel
 Rüsselsheim am Main, Germany
 Sfântu Gheorghe, Romania
 Târgu Mureș, Romania
 Tekirdağ, Turkey
 Wadowice, Poland

Friendly cities
Kecskemét also cooperates with:
 Großenhain, Germany
 Novi Sad, Serbia
 Tábor, Czech Republic

Military 
The MH 59th "Dezső Szentgyörgyi" Tactical Wing, the only jet fighter unit of the Hungarian Defence Forces, is based at Kecskemét air force base. The Kecskemét Air Show is held here every two years.

Sport
Kecskeméti TE, association football club
Kecskeméti LC, association football club

References 

Notes

External links 

  in Hungarian, English and German
 Kecskemét's local map
 Aerial photography: Kecskemét
 "Hungarian Museum of Photography", Official Website, English
 Kecskemét at funiq.hu

 
County seats in Hungary
Cities with county rights of Hungary
Populated places in Bács-Kiskun County
Populated places established in the 9th century